Stadeck was an important family of ministeriales in Styria during the 13th and 14th centuries.

The family is named for Stattegg castle, beginning with Rudolph I (1192–1230). His son Rudolph II (d. 1261) was a leading minnesinger, featured in Codex Manesse.

Another son of Rudolph I, Hartnid I, was active in the party of Rudolph I of Germany in the feud against Ottokar I of Bohemia.

The male line of the family died out with Johann of Stadeck in 1399.

References
Karl Weinhold, 'Der Minnesinger von Stadeck und sein Geschlecht', Sitzungsberichte der philosophisch-historischen Classe der kaiserlichen Akademie der Wissenschaften vol.  35, Vienna,  1860.
Joseph Bergmann, Die letzten Herren von Stadeck und ihre Erben,  Sitzungsberichte... vol. 9, Vienna,  1853.

People from Styria
14th-century Austrian people
Minnesingers
13th-century Austrian poets